The Hound of the Baskervilles is a 1981 Soviet television film adaptation of Arthur Conan Doyle's 1902 novel The Hound of the Baskervilles. It was the third instalment in the TV series about adventures of Sherlock Holmes and Doctor Watson.

Production

The film features an all-star cast: in addition to the famous Livanov-Solomin duo as Holmes and Watson, the film stars the internationally acclaimed actor/director Nikita Mikhalkov as Sir Henry Baskerville and the Russian movie legend Oleg Yankovsky as Jack Stapleton. The hound uses the simple but effective device of painting a skull on the dog's face.

Cast 
 Vasily Livanov as Sherlock Holmes
 Vitaly Solomin as Dr. Watson
 Rina Zelyonaya as Mrs. Hudson
 Borislav Brondukov as Inspector Lestrade
 Irina Kupchenko as Beryl Stapleton
 Nikita Mikhalkov as Sir Henry Baskerville
 Alla Demidova as Laura Lyons
 Sergey Martinson as Mr. Frankland
 Oleg Yankovsky as Stapleton
 Aleksandr Adabashyan as Barrymore
 Svetlana Kryuchkova as Mrs. Barrymore
 Yevgeny Steblov as Dr. Mortimer

References

External links

A page dedicated to the series

Films based on The Hound of the Baskervilles
1981 films
1980s Russian-language films
Lenfilm films
Soviet television miniseries
Films directed by Igor Maslennikov
1980s Soviet television series
Films shot in Estonia
Soviet crime films
Russian crime films
1980s television miniseries